Ernst (Ernest) Sabila (18 March 1932 – 5 February 2022) was a Belarusian Protestant religious leader, dissident and Gulag survivor.

Biography
Born in the village of Dziehciarouka (now part of Minsk District), SSR Belarus, USSR, he studied at the Minsk Medical Institute.

In 1951, while still a student, he was arrested by Soviet authorities and accused of religious and nationalist propaganda. He was sentenced to death but the sentence was then replaced by a 25 years labour camp imprisonment.

In 1964, after 13 years in a Gulag labour camp, Ernst Sabila was released and returned to religious activism in Belarus. From the moment of his release, he was under constant surveillance of the KGB.

In the 1970s, he managed to receive a part-time degree at the Minsk State Linguistic University.

In 1988, he became presbyter of the Evangelian church of Belarus. In 1989, pastor Sabila took part in the founding conference of the Belarusian Popular Front.

From the late 2000s until his death, Sabila was among the members of the revived Belarusian Christian Democracy. He died on 5 February 2022, at the age of 89.

References 

1932 births
2022 deaths
People from Minsk District
Clergy from Minsk
Belarusian Protestants
Belarusian Christian Democracy politicians
Soviet dissidents
Belarusian prisoners and detainees